Milan Kopecký (born May 11, 1981) is a Czech professional ice hockey player for EA Schongau in the German Regionalliga. Kopecký was drafted in the ninth round of the 2000 NHL Entry Draft by the Philadelphia Flyers, but he has never played professionally in North America. He previously played in the Czech Extraliga for HC Slavia Praha, HC České Budějovice, and HC Litvínov.

His elder brother Jan Kopecký also played the sport professionally.

Career statistics

References

External links

1981 births
Living people
HL Anyang players
HC Berounští Medvědi players
Czech ice hockey centres
HC Dukla Jihlava players
Kiekko-Vantaa players
HC Litvínov players
BK Mladá Boleslav players
Motor České Budějovice players
IHC Písek players
Philadelphia Flyers draft picks
HC Slavia Praha players
Ice hockey people from Prague
Czech expatriate ice hockey players in Germany
Czech expatriate ice hockey players in Finland
Czech expatriate sportspeople in South Korea
Expatriate ice hockey players in South Korea